Cardini is an Italian surname. Notable people with the surname include:

Caesar Cardini (1896–1956), Italian American restaurateur, chef and hotel owner
Ignazio Cardini (1566–1602), Corsican doctor, naturalist and humanist of Italian descent
Leobardo Cardini (or Candiani; 1904–1986), Mexican fencer
Maria Timpanaro Cardini, born Maria Cardini (1890–1978) Italian philologist

See also
Richard Valentine Pitchford alias "Cardini" (1895–1973), British master magician

Italian-language surnames

it:Cardini